Midland is an electoral district of the Legislative Assembly in the Australian state of Western Australia.

The district is located in the eastern suburbs of Perth.

Midland has been held by the Labor since its creation, however it was retained by Labor at the 2013 election by 23 votes, which made it the most marginal seat in the Western Australian parliament during the 2013–2017 term.

Geography
Midland is based in the outer eastern suburbs of Perth. It includes the communities of Bellevue, Boya, Greenmount, Guildford, Hazelmere, Helena Valley, Jane Brook, Koongamia, Midland, Midvale, Stratton, Swan View, Viveash, Woodbridge, as well as parts of the communities of Darlington, Middle Swan, Red Hill, and South Guildford.

History
Midland was first created for the 1996 state election. It largely replaced the abolished seat of Helena, with another portion coming from the abolished seat of Glendalough. The district's first representative was Labor's Michelle Roberts, the last member for Glendalough. Roberts has held the seat ever since.

The seat was originally created as a marginal Labor seat, and remained so in the 1996 election. However, Roberts picked up a healthy swing of nine percent in 2001 as her party won government. She was reelected in 2005 with only a small swing against her even as her party was convincingly reelected. She served as a prominent minister in the Gallop and Carpenter governments.

A redistribution ahead of the 2008 election made Midland slightly more secure for Roberts, and she was reelected even as her party narrowly lost government. In 2013, however, Roberts was nearly defeated by Liberal challenger Daniel Parasiliti, with only Green preferences allowing her to survive by 24 votes. Roberts saw off Parasiliti with somewhat less difficulty in a 2017 rematch as her party regained government on the strength of a strong showing in Perth, picking up enough of a swing to make Midland a safe Labor seat in one stroke. She consolidated that swing in 2021 amid the massive Labor wave that swept through the state that year, and now sits on a margin of 25.5 percent. She was elected as Speaker of the Legislative Assembly, the first woman to hold the post.

Members for Midland

Election results

References

External links
 ABC election profiles: 2005 2008
 WAEC district maps: current boundaries, previous distributions

Midland
Midland, Western Australia